The cabinet of Jeanine Áñez constituted the 220th and 221st cabinets of the Plurinational State of Bolivia. It was initially formed on 13 November 2019, a day after Jeanine Áñez was sworn-in as the 66th president of Bolivia following the 2019 political crisis, in which the ruling Movement for Socialism government resigned. A second cabinet was formed on 28 January 2020 with all but three ministers being ratified in their positions.

The cabinet suffered numerous structural changes and was noted for its high turnover rate. In just under a year, thirty-seven individuals occupied twenty ministerial portfolios with three ministries being abolished entirely by the end of Áñez's mandate. Political analyst Marcelo Silva attributed the administration's instability to the fact that "Jeanine Áñez didn't imagine, not even in the best of scenarios, becoming president. There is a hint of improvisation, because there was no methodical plan for organizing a government". Despite assurances that all ministers had been inaugurated in a non-partisan capacity, multiple had political and personal links with Rubén Costas, the leader of Áñez's Democrat Social Movement, and Luis Fernando Camacho, a civic leader prominent in the protests which preceded Áñez's assumption to office.

Cabinet ministers

Structural changes

Notes

References 

2019 establishments in Bolivia
2020 disestablishments in Bolivia
Cabinets of Bolivia
Cabinets established in 2019
Cabinets disestablished in 2020